Bela Gogsadze (born 4 December 1987) is a Georgian former footballer who played as a defender. She has officially played for the senior Georgia women's national team.

International career
Gogsadze capped for Georgia at senior level during the UEFA Women's Euro 2009 qualifying.

References

1987 births
Living people
Women's association football defenders
Women's footballers from Georgia (country)
Georgia (country) women's international footballers